John Cutler alias Carwithan (died 1467?) of Exeter, Devon, was an English politician.

He was a member of the Parliament of England (MP) for Exeter in May 1421, 1425, 1429, 1433 and 1461. He was mayor of Exeter in 1436–7, 1442–3 and 1448–9.

References

Year of birth missing
1467 deaths
English MPs May 1421
Members of the Parliament of England (pre-1707) for Exeter
Mayors of Exeter
English MPs 1425
English MPs 1429
English MPs 1433
English MPs 1461